Christian Widule was a member of the Wisconsin State Assembly and Wisconsin State Senate.

Biography
Widule was born on July 19, 1845, in Germany. He died from a stroke on October 9, 1916, in Milwaukee, Wisconsin.

Career
Widule was a member of the Assembly in 1879 and of the Senate from 1887 to 1889. He was a Republican.

References

External links
The Political Graveyard

Politicians from Milwaukee
Republican Party Wisconsin state senators
Republican Party members of the Wisconsin State Assembly
1845 births
1916 deaths
19th-century American politicians